Shatter is a comic created by Peter B. Gillis and Mike Saenz, and published by First Comics. The comic is dystopian science fiction fantasy somewhat in the mold of Blade Runner, "We Can Remember It for You Wholesale", and other cyberpunk stories. Shatter was written by Gillis and illustrated directly on a computer by Saenz.

Shatter was the first commercially published comic where all art for publication was entered by hand on the computer as opposed to later methods of scanning in inked pages for color application. Until the late 1970s to early 1980s computer generated comics were done with traditional text and line-printing techniques or semigraphics, ascii art, and BBC's ceefax teletext.

Production
Shatter was drawn on an original Macintosh Plus in MacPaint and later using FullPaint by Ann Arbor Softworks. Page data was stored on an external 800K floppy disk drive. The drawings were difficult to manage due to the limited 9" 72ppi monochrome screen (512×342 pixels) as only roughly 2/3 of the page was able to be worked on at one time. Approximately half of the issues were drawn using the standard Macintosh mouse until graphics tablet pen type digitizers and video still frame digitizers like the Koala MacVision became available. Artwork was printed on an Apple dot-matrix ImageWriter until 1985 when Apple donated a Laserwriter enabling Adobe PostScript font styles for typesetting text, and made illustration graphics smoother and less pixelated. Once printed the art was then colored by Saenz, and then photographed for mass printing using traditional comic publication techniques for page layouts and color separation.

Following Saenz' departure after issue #3, issues 4-7 diverged to traditional art on board artwork which was scanned into the computer. Once Charlie Athanas was hired for issues 8 until the series end the artwork returned to a nearly all digital workflow. The only exception were that rough pencil drafts started the process which allowed editors to approve layouts and writers to begin creating the stories. Artwork was still directly drawn into the computer. The new method allowed for faster publication times for the remainder of the series.

Publication history
Shatter first appeared in the March 1985 issue (#12) of computer magazine Big K (IPC Media, London with Tony Tyler as editor) and was described as "the world's first comics series entirely drawn on a computer". During this same period, Shatter appeared simultaneously as a one-shot special and as a backup feature in First Comics’ Jon Sable title in 1985. Shatter was then published as its own 14-issue series from 1985-1988. The book was art-directed by Alex Wald. Collections have been published by First Comics and AiT/Planet Lar.

Timeline
 March 1985: the first episode of Shatter, written by Gillis and illustrated by Saenz, is featured in the British computer magazine. Big K, published by IPC Magazines (now IPC Media). It consists of a black and white version of the first four pages of the John Sable: Freelance backup feature. While the last page promises "Continued next month in BIG K", it was the final issue of the magazine.
 June 1985: Shatter Special No.1, published by First Comics is released; editor Mike Gold expects the series to run as a backup feature in Jon Sable: Freelance for 6–12 months.
 June–November 1985: Shatter runs as an 8-page backup feature in Jon Sable: Freelance issues #25-30.
 December 1985: Shatter releases issue #1 that sells out all 60,000 printed copies (First Comics does not do multiple printings). 
 May 1986: Artist Mike Saenz leaves after three issues. He creates ComicWorks for software company Macromind as the first personal digital publishing software system for comic creation. After combining with Paracomp in 1991, MacroMind-Paracomp merges with Authorware, Inc to form Macromedia in 1992, which was acquired in 2005 by Adobe Systems.
 June–December 1986: With the departure of Saenz, artwork reverts to traditional art on board which is first drawn, inked then scanned into the computer for manipulation for issues 4-8 using existing artists, Steve Erwin and Bob Dienethal. Due to primitive scanning technology, artwork was generally less defined and resulted in a less clean look from the original issues. 
 December 1986: Bruce Sterling coins the term "cyberpunk" in the preface to the short story anthology Mirrorshades (1986) featuring William Gibson, Tom Maddox, Pat Cadigan, Rudy Rucker, Marc Laidlaw, James Patrick Kelly, Greg Bear, Lewis Shiner, John Shirley and Paul Di Filippo.
 April 1987: Charlie Athanas is brought on for issues 9-14. Athanas re-establishes drawing directly on the Macintosh Plus with the computer mouse. In an effort to increase publication efficiency, rough pencil sketches were draftewd in order to breakdown layouts, expedite script writing, and get editor approval. Once approved, Athanas manually re-drew the rough sketches directly into the computer without the use of scanners. Eliminating scanned artwork resulted in cleaner art style. Dialog was able to be added as soon as writers had it available using the lettering from the Laserwriter's PostScript libraries which contributed to the overall style of the comic. 
 April 1988: Shatter completes its 14 issue run. On April 12, Shatter is released as a trade paperback by Ballantine Books.
 July 25, 2006: The Shatter collection is re-printed by AIT/Planet Lar.

Storyline and characters
Shatter: The Revolutionary Graphic Novel (1988) features this synopsis:

The Shatter (2006) trade paperback collection features this synopsis:

Bibliography
 Gillis, Peter & Saenz, Mike  (June 1985–Nov. 1985). "Shatter", Jon Sable: Freelance, backup feature, issues #25-30, First Comics
 Gillis, Peter & Saenz, Mike  (June 1985). Shatter Special No.1 "Headhunters", First Comics
 Gillis, Peter; Saenz, Mike; Erwin, Steve; Dienethal, Bob; Athanas, Charlie (Nov. [Dec.] 1985–April 1988). Shatter, Issues #1-14, First Comics
 Issue #1 (12/1985): Now with the ranks of the Artists' Underground, Shatter is sent on a mission against Simon Schuster Jovanovich and his franchises in an untitled story.
 Issue #2 (02/1986): Shatter discovers that several different forces are after him and they all want what's inside his head in "Avenues of Escape".
 Issue #3 (06/1986): Now with the Alien Nation, Shatter tries to stay alive as he still has people pursuing him in an untitled story.
 Issue #4 (08/1986): It's the Alien Nation battling with the Simon, Shuster & Jovanovitch and the Artists' Underground while Shatter goes against Cyan in a final confrontation in an untitled story.
 Issue #5 (10/1986): Shatter finds himself right in the thick of a war zone, but he has no idea how he got there and what war it is in "The Third World War – Part 1".
 Issue #6 (12/1986): Still in the middle of a war and still having no idea how he got there, Shatter has to escape from a prison camp and stay alive in "The Third World War – Part 2: Adam's Rib".
 Issue #7 (02/1987): Shatter gets captured again and now finds himself in Singapore as he tries to figure out how he got into that war in "The Third World War Conclusion: Bringing Up Baby".
 Issue #8 (04/1987): Realizing that he is a wanted man in the free world and the third world, Shatter, with Dr. Chuang Tzu, heads for the Soviet Union in "Red Dawns, White Nights & Blue Mondays". 
 Issue #9 (06/1987): Shatter returns to Daley City with Ravenant, a former contract soldier, and they infiltrate the headquarters of a drug conglomerate and meet an old enemy of Shatter's in "Daley City Vid".
 Issue #10 (08/1987): With his new RNA talents, Shatter tries them out in Bezirk, a live-action, computerized role-playing game and discovers a hidden underground army in "The Angel – Big Cats on the Breakvine".
 Issue #11 (10/1987): After reuniting with the real Jack Scratch, Shatter learns from him several important things including the location of the Dreamers' Vault, but Scratch may not be telling the truth in "One-Eyed Jacks and Suicide Kings".
 Issue #12 (12/1987): Shatter manages to get a force of the Alien Nation and the Allnight Newsboys together to stop an insurance war that was destroying Daley City in "Singing the Alien Nation Blues".
 Issue #13 (02/1988): Now back on the beat, Shatter tries to find out why and how lethal toxins which kill people got into the water supply in "Utopia, Ltd. – Part 1".
 Issue #14 (04/1988): The case of the lethal toxins in the water supply becomes much bigger than anticipated as Shatter has to save Daley City, but he has help from an unexpected source in "Utopia, Ltd. - Conclusion".
 Gillis, Peter & Saenz, Mike  (April 12, 1988). Shatter: The Revolutionary Graphic Novel, Ballantine Books  [collects issues #1–11]
 Gillis, Peter & Saenz, Mike  (July 25, 2006). Shatter, AiT/PlanetLar  [collects issues #1–4 & Shatter Special]

References

Sources
 McCloud, Scott. Reinventing Comics, pp. 140, 165, Paradox Press, 2000.

External links
 Diak, Nicholas (March 6, 2019) "Assimilate and Manipulate: Industrial Music and Cyberpunk in the Comic Series ‘Shatter’", We Are The Mutants
 Harter, Maurice (1997) "Comics", Lightworks
 Szadkowski, Joseph (July 1, 2000). "Digital Production Comes of Age in the Comic World", Animation World Magazine
 "Comic ceator: Mike Saenz", Lambiek Comiclopedia
 "Peter B. Gillis Bibliography", True Stories
 Athanas, Charlie "Comic Books: Shatter Issues #9-14", Burning City
 "Charlie Athanas - Personal Website", 'Charlie Athanas' Comic Art - Shatter
 
 
 "Un-holy Alliance:Shatter and the aesthetics of cyberpunk", Ernesto Priego 22 Aug, 2011
 "The Dawn of Computer Comics: Shatter", The Computer History Museum's @CHM Museum Blog
 "On History: Shatter By Sean Kleefeld", Tuesday, March 24, 2015
 "The Problem with Shatter" Greg Burgas, Comic Book Resources 07.30.2006

Cyberpunk comics
First Comics titles
1985 comics debuts
Dystopian comics